Junior Miss is a collection of semi-autobiographical stories by Sally Benson first published in The New Yorker. Between 1929 and the end of 1941, the prolific Benson published 99 stories in The New Yorker, some under her pseudonym of Esther Evarts. She had a bestseller when Doubleday published her Junior Miss collection in 1941.

Broadway
Benson's stories were adapted for theatre by writers Jerome Chodorov and Joseph Fields, by producer Max Gordon, and by director Moss Hart. The play had a successful run of 710 performances on Broadway from November 18, 1941, to July 24, 1943. Patricia Peardon had the title role of Judy Graves, a teenager who meddles in people's love lives.

Film
 
In 1945, a film adaptation of the play by Jerome Chodorov and Joseph Fields starred Peggy Ann Garner as Judy Graves. George Seaton directed. Produced by William Perlberg, the 94-minute feature was released by 20th Century Fox on June 16, 1945.

Radio

Junior Miss was featured several times in different formats on U.S. radio. Sponsored by Procter & Gamble, the first series was broadcast from March 4 to August 26, 1942, with Shirley Temple playing the lead character Judy Graves. Priscilla Lyon played her friend, Fuffy Adams, "the odd child from the apartment downstairs." Benson and Doris Gilbert collaborated on writing the show. Broadcast on Wednesday evenings, the program cost $12,000 a week to produce.

From 1944 to 1946, a Junior Miss segment, based on Benson's short stories, was a regular feature in the Mary Small Show (later changed to the Mary Small-Junior Miss Show).

In the late 1940s and early 1950s, the Junior Miss radio program starred Barbara Whiting, who had appeared in the 1945 film as Fuffy Adams. That series ran from April 3, 1948, to December 30, 1950, sponsored by Lever Brothers. The music was composed and conducted by Walter Schumann. The 1948-50 cast returned for another season in various formats and timeslots from October 2, 1952, to July 1, 1954.

The film version of Junior Miss was promoted on radio twice in 1946, with Peggy Ann Garner performing her role as Judy Graves in a shortened version of the film on CBS's Hollywood Star Time as well as Lady Esther Screen Guild Theater.

Television

Chodorov and Fields’ version of Junior Miss was adapted as a television musical and broadcast on December 20, 1957, as part of CBS Television's DuPont Show of the Month. Carol Lynley had the lead role of Judy Graves with Don Ameche and Joan Bennett as her parents and Susanne Sidney as Fuffy Adams. Others in the cast were Diana Lynn, Paul Ford, Jill St. John and David Wayne.

References

External links
 

1940s American radio programs
1941 short story collections
American short story collections
Works originally published in The New Yorker
CBS Radio programs
Random House books